His Daughter's Dilemma is a 1916 British silent drama film directed by Ralph Dewsbury and starring Ben Webster, Manora Thew and Philip Hewland.

Cast
 Ben Webster as Bernard Venn  
 Manora Thew as Madeleine Kingsley  
 Philip Hewland as Dr. Mackenzie  
 Gwynne Herbert as Lady Kingsley  
 Hubert Willis as Sharp  
 Christine Rayner as Rose Twining

References

Bibliography
 Palmer Scott. British Film Actors' Credits, 1895-1987. McFarland, 1988.

External links

1916 films
1916 drama films
British silent feature films
British drama films
Films directed by Ralph Dewsbury
British black-and-white films
1910s English-language films
1910s British films
Silent drama films